is a Japanese singer-songwriter and voice actress. She released her debut EP, in 2014 and is best known as the voice of Suzu Naito in Belle.

Career
Nakamura's debut EP, was released on May 31, 2014. Her first studio album,  was released on July 2, 2016, followed by her first single, on March 22, 2017, and her second studio album, Ainou, on November 7, 2018. In 2021, Nakamura debuted as a voice actress in the animated science fantasy film Belle as the main character Suzu Naito. She released her third studio album, Nia, on March 23, 2022. In May 2022, she featured on the song "Reflection" from the Tofubeats album of the same name.

Discography

Studio albums

Extended plays

Singles

Filmography

Animated films

Awards and nominations

References

External links
 

1992 births
Living people
Japanese voice actresses
Musicians from Kyoto
Voice actresses from Kyoto
21st-century Japanese actresses
21st-century Japanese singers
21st-century Japanese women singers